Raphitoma mirabilis is a species of sea snail, a marine gastropod mollusk in the family Raphitomidae.

Description
The length of the shell reaches 9 mm.

The very slender, fusiform, turriculate shell has a high spire and a pointed apex. It contains 7 convex whorls, of which two in the protoconch. They show longitudinal ribs, lamellar, spaced, narrow, elevated, and smaller decurrent threads forming a reticulation with nodules. The aperture is ovate and measures a little less than half the length of the shell. The siphonal canal is rather long. The columella is straight and slightly twisted at the base. The rounded outer lip is thin, not wrinkled and notched at the edge of the suture. The ground color of the shell is reddish brown on which the reticulation comes off in white.

Distribution
This marine species occurs off Tunisia.

References

 Nordsieck F. (1977). The Turridae of the European seas. Roma: La Conchiglia. 131 pp.
 Gofas, S.; Le Renard, J.; Bouchet, P. (2001). Mollusca. in: Costello, M.J. et al. (eds), European Register of Marine Species: a check-list of the marine species in Europe and a bibliography of guides to their identification. Patrimoines Naturels. 50: 180-213

External links
 
 Gastropods.com: Raphitoma (Raphitoma) mirabilis
 Natural History Museum, Rotterdam: Raphitoma mirabilis

mirabilis
Gastropods described in 1904